A klobasnek (Czech klobásník , plural klobásníky, meaning "a roll made of sweet, spun dough known as koláč made and often filled with klobása or other fillings") is a chiefly American Czech savory finger food. Klobasneks are much more commonly known as kolaches in Texas, but should not be confused with traditional Czech kolaches, which are also popular and are known by the same name. Klobasneks are similar in style to sausage rolls, but the meat is wrapped in kolache dough. Klobasneks have become a significant element of Texan culture and can be found everywhere from gas stations (including Texas symbol Buc-ees) to specialized kolache shops throughout the state, even outside areas with large Czech Texan populations.

Unlike traditional kolaches, which came to the United States with Moravian immigrants, klobasneks were first made by Czechs who settled in Texas. The regional pastry is served as an Easter treat in the south of Moravian Silesia region and is filled with klobása or a chopped prepared meat.

Traditionally klobasneks are filled with sausage, but as their popularity has increased in the United States, other ingredients such as ham, eggs, cheese and peppers are used alongside or instead of sausage. In Texas, a number of regionally unique and culturally syncretic filling ingredients include the Cajun pork and rice sausage called boudin.

See also 
 Klobása
 Bierock
 Sausage roll
 Pepperoni roll
 Kolaches
 Czech Stop and Little Czech Bakery
 List of hot dogs
 List of pastries
 List of sausage dishes
 List of stuffed dishes

References 

Czech-American cuisine
Texan cuisine
Czech pastries
Hot dogs
Stuffed dishes